The Unexpected Father is a 1932 American comedy film directed by Thornton Freeland and starring Slim Summerville, Zasu Pitts, and Cora Sue Collins.

The film's sets were designed by the art director Thomas F. O'Neill.

Plot

Cast
 Slim Summerville as Jasper Jones
 Zasu Pitts as Polly Perkins
 Cora Sue Collins as Pudge
 Alison Skipworth as Mrs. Hawkins
 Dorothy Christy as Evelyn Smythe
 Grayce Hampton as Mrs. Smythe
 Claud Allister as Claude
 Tyrell Davis as Reggie
 Tom O'Brien as Policeman
 Richard Cramer as Policeman

References

Bibliography
 Stumpf, Charles. ZaSu Pitts: The Life and Career. McFarland, 2010.

External links
 

1932 films
1932 comedy films
American comedy films
Films directed by Thornton Freeland
Universal Pictures films
American black-and-white films
1930s English-language films
1930s American films
Films with screenplays by Richard Schayer
English-language comedy films